This is a list of largest reservoirs in India, including all artificial lakes with a capacity greater or equal to . In terms of number of dams, India ranks third after China, and USA. However per capita storage in India is only 225 cubic metres, which is far less compared to China(1,200 cubic metres),” Currently there are 7,216 completed large dams and 447 are under construction.  In India most of the dams are maintained by the State Governments while there are a few other organizations, namely, Bhakra Beas Management Board (BBMB), Damodar Valley Corporation (DVC) and National Hydro Electric Power Corporation (NHPC) who also now own and operate dams.

List

See also
List of dams and reservoirs in India
List of reservoirs by volume

External links 
National Register of Large Dam -2019

References

Reservoirs, largest
India

Indian superlatives